Maringes is a commune in the Loire department in central France. The mayor is François Dumont, elected in 2020.

Population

See also
Communes of the Loire department

References

Communes of Loire (department)